The Madison is a relay race event in track cycling, named after the first Madison Square Garden in New York, and known as the "American race" in French (course à l'américaine) and as Americana in Spanish and in Italian.

The race
The Madison is a race where each team aims to complete  more laps than any of the other teams. Riders in each team take turns during the race, handing over to another team member, resting, and then returning to the race. Teams are usually of two riders but occasionally of three. Only one rider of the team is racing at any time, and the replacement rider has to be touched before taking over. The touch can also be a push, often on the shorts, or one rider hurling the other into the race by a hand-sling.

How long each rider stays in the race is for the members of each team to decide. Originally, riders took stints of a couple of hours or more and the resting rider went off for a sleep or a meal. That was easier in earlier six-day races because hours could pass without riders attempting to speed away from the others. As races became more intensive, both riders from a team began riding on the track at the same time, one going fast on the short line around the bottom of the track and the other idling higher up until that rider's turn to take over. Modern six-days last less than 12 hours a day and the Madison is now only a featured part, so staying on the track throughout is more feasible.

Tied positions are split by points awarded for placings at a series of sprints at intervals during the race.

The Madison is a feature of six-day races, but it can also be a separate race, as in the Olympic Games. It has its own championships and specialist riders.

History
The Madison began as a way of circumventing laws passed in New York in the US, aimed at restricting the exhaustion of cyclists taking part in six-day races.

According to a contemporary newspaper clipping retained by Major Taylor:

The riders are becoming peevish and fretful.  The wear and tear upon their nerves and their muscles, and the loss of sleep make them so. If their desires are not met with on the moment, they break forth with a stream of abuse. Nothing pleases them. These outbreaks do not trouble the trainers with experience, for they understand the condition the men are in.

The condition included delusions and hallucinations. Riders wobbled and frequently fell. But the riders were often well paid, especially since more people came to watch them as their condition worsened. Promoters in New York paid Teddy Hale $5,000 when he won in 1896 and he won "like a ghost, his face as white as a corpse, his eyes no longer visible because they'd retreated into his skull," as one report had it.

The New York Times said in 1897:

An athletic contest in which participants "go queer" in their heads, and strain their powers until their faces become hideous with the tortures that rack them, is not sport. It is brutality. Days and weeks of recuperation will be needed to put the Garden racers in condition, and it is likely that some of them will never recover from the strain.

Alarmed, New York and Illinois ruled in 1898 that no competitor could race for more than 12 hours a day. The promoter of the event at Madison Square Garden, reluctant to close his stadium for half the day, realised that giving each rider a partner with whom he could share the racing meant the race could still go on 24 hours a day but that no one rider would exceed the 12-hour limit. Speeds rose, distances grew, crowds increased, money poured in. Where Charlie Miller rode  alone, the Australian Alf Goullet and a decent partner could ride .

The full rules

The official rules of the Madison, which are traditionally regarded as being hard to follow, are stated as follows by British Cycling, the British Governing Body of Cycling:

 Teams shall be of two or three riders wearing the same colours and number: in the Olympics and World Championships, participants compete in pairs.
 There must be one rider of each team in the race at all times.
 Riders may relieve each other at any time during the race.
 Changing shall take place below the stayers line, and as near to the inside edge of the track as practicable.
 Relieved riders must take up a position outside the stayers line as soon as it is safe and practicable.
 Changing shall be by one rider drawing level with the other and touching to denote relief.
 The touch may be a push or handsling.
 The winners of the race shall be the team which gains the most laps on the other teams.
 If two or more teams are on the same lap, the result shall be determined by the team which has won the most sprint points during the race.
 Should there be an equality of laps and points, the winners shall be the best placed team in the final sprint.
 The race shall end when the leading team has completed the distance.
 Lapped riders need not fulfil lost laps, and shall be placed as so many laps behind the winners.
 At pre-determined times during the race there will be sprints for points, with the first four teams over the line gaining 5, 3, 2 and 1 points respectively.
 A whistle shall be blown to indicate one lap to go before a sprint.
 A bell will be rung at the start of the last lap.
 Teams that rejoin the field after gaining or losing laps, shall be eligible for sprint points.
 Should one member of a team suffer a puncture or mishap, that rider will be allowed to rejoin the race. However, his/her partner should rejoin the race within two laps being covered by the field from the point at which the incident occurred. The Chief Commissaire will pair the rider in the race with another team which is at the same relative position in the race. The rider will ride 'in and out' with the nominated member of the other team until his/her partner rejoins the race.
 Any team retiring from the race shall inform the Chief Commissaire immediately.
 Teams may be disciplined by losing points, losing laps or disqualification for misconduct, unfair and/or dangerous riding.
 The Chief Commissaire may neutralise a race should it be considered necessary to do so (i.e. in the case of a crash involving several teams or the track becoming unsafe and/or impracticable for use).
 The Chief Commissaire may terminate a race before the full distance should it be considered essential to do so.
 The Chief Commissaire may withdraw teams who fall too many laps behind or who, in their opinion, may constitute a danger to other riders.

Olympics
The Madison was an Olympic event for men in 2000, 2004 and 2008, but was dropped ahead of the 2012 London Olympics, in part for reasons of gender equality as there was no equivalent race for women at that time.

In June 2017, the International Olympic Committee announced that the Madison would be added to the Olympic programme for the 2020 Summer Olympics. The 2020 Games includes a relaunch of the men's Madison event, as well as the introduction of the women's Madison as an Olympic event for the first time. The inaugural women's event was won by Katie Archibald and Laura Kenny for Team GB.

Records

Points
Men

Women

Times
Men

See also
Cycling at the Summer Olympics

References

External links 
 Kenny and Archibald win madison gold

 
Events in track cycling
Sports originating in the United States